Carpophthoromyia tessmanni is a species of tephritid or fruit flies in the genus Carpophthoromyia of the family Tephritidae.

References

Dacinae